Naati Pinky Ki Lambi Love Story (Short Pinky's Long Love Story) is an Indian television drama series which premiered 27 January 2020 on Colors TV. Produced by Bodhi Tree Productions, it starred Riya Shukla and Puneett Chouksey.

Plot
Lavanya "Pinky" Kashyap is an aspiring comedian who is often teased for her shortness. She marries Gagan. After the marriage, they learned of his extramarital affair leading Pinky to leave the house and return to her maternal home. During a disagreement with her father she leaves the house along with her grandmother Sarla. At Arjun's insistence, they accept to live with him but only if he takes a deposit for their rent. Arjun helps Pinky to divorce Gagan, and convince her conservative father, who continues to try to hurt her while Arjun protects her putting his life in danger. Pinky also starts to dress up as Imarti, something which her dadi knows about and eventually her mother Nalini and aunt Antara (her father's sister). She also marries Arjun as Imarti (as their fake marriage ends up as a real one) to help him gain custody of Nandu who is revealed to be his adopted daughter as he and Ananya had three miscarriages. Meanwhile, Arjun's mother, whom Arjun hates tries to re-enter his life and to have him marry a girl of her choice. Later on Pinky on Antara's insistence realizes that she has started developing feelings for Arjun but goes on to agree to marry Vikas, a boy chosen by her father. Antara on one hand promises to unite Arjun and Pinky against Pinky's mother and even Pinky, who does not want to oppose her father's wishes. At the end, Pinky's father agrees to marry her and accepts Arjun as Pinky's husband. Arjun says that Naati Pinky ki Lambi Love Story is completed and there comes a caption that reads To New Beginnings.

Cast

Main
 Riya Shukla as Lavanya "Pinky" Venkatraman/Bhardwaj/Kashyap alias Imarti: Nalini and Ram's daughter; Ananya's younger sister; Gagan's former wife; Arjun's wife
 Puneett Chouksey as Arjun Venkatraman: Revati's son: Ananya's widower; Nandu's adoptive father; Pinky's husband

Recurring
 Vishwajeet Pradhan as Ram Kashyap: Sarla's son; Lakshman and Antara's brother; Nalini's husband; Ananya and Pinky's father
 Pyumori Mehta Ghosh as Nalini Kashyap: Ram's wife; Ananya and Pinky's mother
 Bharati Achrekar as Sarla Kashyap: Ram, Antara and Lakshman's mother
 Neelam Gupta as Asha Kashyap: Lakshman's wife; Sarthak and Shraddha's mother
 Madan Tyagi as Lakshman Kashyap: Sarla's son; Ram and Antara's brother; Asha's husband; Sarthak and Shraddha's father
 Sheetal Ranjankar as Shraddha Kashyap: Asha and Lakshman's daughter; Sarthak's sister
 Arjun Singh Shekhawat as Sarthak Kashyap: Asha and Lakshman's son; Shraddha's brother
 Unknown as Ananya Venkatraman: Nalini and Ram's daughter; Pinky's sister; Arjun's former wife; Nandu's adoptive mother
 Aadya Jha/Adiba Hussain as Nandini "Nandu" Venkatraman: Ananya and Arjun's adoptive daughter
 Jaskaran Singh Gandi as Sunny Narvekar: Arjun's best friend
 Anjali Mukhi as Revati Venkatraman: Arjun's mother
 Dhiraj Rai as Gagan Bhardwaj: Pinky's former husband; Megha's former lover
 Ravneet Kaur as Megha Singhania: Gagan's former lover
 Vibhuti Thakur as Kanchan Bhardwaj: Gagan's aunt
 Gurdeep Kohli as Antara Kashyap: Sarla's daughter; Ram and Lakshman's sister
 Priyal Gor as Parvathy
 Adhitya deshmukh as Vikas Kumar Patel
 Sangeeta Adhikary as Kalyani Naagar
 Ira Dua as Child Protection Rights Officer

Guest appearance
 Nimrit Kaur Ahluwalia as Meher Sarabjeet Singh Gill from Choti Sarrdaarni (2020)

Production
The production and airing of the show was halted indefinitely in late March 2020 due to the COVID-19 outbreak in India. Because of the outbreak, the filming of television series and films was halted on 19 March 2020 and expected to resume on 1 April 2020 but could not and the series was last broadcast on 13 July 2020 when the remaining episodes were aired.

References

External links

 

Indian television soap operas
2020 Indian television series debuts
Colors TV original programming
Hindi-language television shows
Indian drama television series
Television shows set in Mumbai